The United States's Aqueduct nuclear test series was a group of 10 nuclear tests conducted in 1989–1990. These tests followed the Operation Cornerstone series and preceded the Operation Sculpin series.

Lists of the nuclear tests

References

Explosions in 1989
Explosions in 1990
1989 in military history
1990 in military history
Aqueduct